Infant or infants are human children at the youngest stage of life.

Infant or Infants may also refer to:
 Cleveland Infants, a one-year baseball team in the Players' League
 Zanesville Infants, a short-lived baseball franchise affiliated with the Central League
 Infante, also anglicised as Infant, a title and rank in the Iberian kingdoms of Spain and Portugal
 a legal term referring to any child under the age of legal adulthood
 The Infant (Fonvizin play), 1872
 Infant school, a school for children up to age 7 in England and Wales
 Infant simulator, a lifelike electronic doll

See also 
 
 
 Infant moth (disambiguation), several species of moth
 Infanta (disambiguation)
 Infante (disambiguation)
 Babyhood (disambiguation)
 Baby (disambiguation)